Tony or Anthony Parsons may refer to:

 Tony Parsons (Canadian journalist) (born 1939), Canadian news anchor
 Tony Parsons (British journalist) (born 1953), novelist and arts critic
 Tony Parsons, TV series character, see list of past Coronation Street characters
 Antony Parsons, 2014 World Snooker Championship
 Anthony Parsons (9 September 1922 – 12 August 1996), British diplomat
 Anthony Parsons (musician) (born 1989), English singer-songwriter
 Tony Parsons (Australian author) (born 1931), Australian author

See also